The Council of Ten ( or ) was a group of Ibn Tumart's earliest and closest disciples, at the top of the hierarchy of the Almohad movement. It was composed of members from different tribes, including ‘Abd al-Mu’min al-Kumi of the Zanata, the chronicler al-Baydhaq of the Sanhaja, and the tribal chief Abu Hafs ‘Umar al-Hintati of the Masmuda. The Council of Ten evoked the image of the Prophet Muhammad's ten companions, though sources indicate that, for the Almohad council, ten was more of a name than a fixed number of members.

The status of members of the Council of Ten was based, not on tribal origin, but on adherence to Almohad doctrine and proximity to Ibn Tumart. Members of the Council of Ten were appointed as governors and given military responsibilities from the conquest of Marrakesh in 1147 until 1157, when ‘Abd al-Mu’min started appointing his heirs.

Sources 
Of the few primary sources on the matter there are the anonymous Kitāb al-Ansāb and Ibn al-Qattan's Nuẓm al-Jumān.

References 

Almohad Caliphate
Government in Africa
Islamic political organizations